Écuelles is a former commune in the Seine-et-Marne department in the Île-de-France region in north-central France.

On 1 January 2015, Écuelles and Moret-sur-Loing merged becoming one commune called Orvanne, which merged into the new commune Moret-Loing-et-Orvanne on 1 January 2016.

Demographics
Inhabitants are called Écuellois.

See also
Communes of the Seine-et-Marne department

References

External links

Town Hall

Former communes of Seine-et-Marne